E11 is a 2014 album by Hong Kong musician Janice Vidal.

Track listing 
 錯過你 "Miss You"
 八九十 "Eight, Nine, Ten"
 "You're Always Everything to Me"
 自首 "Surrender"
 激光中 "Laser Light"
 "You Go I Go"
 長痛短痛 "Short Pain Long Pain"
 分手總要在雨天 "Always Break in the Rain"
 原來你甚麼都想要 "So You Want Everything"
 情人甲 "Methanesulfonic Lover" (Duet with Andy Hui)
 "All You Get from Love is a Love Song"

External links 
 A music

2014 albums
Janice Vidal albums